The Oxford University Ice Hockey Club (OUIHC) is home to the Men’s and Women’s Blues ice hockey teams of the University of Oxford, England. The Men's Blues, also known as Oxford University Blues, is one of the world's oldest ice hockey teams. Tradition places the origin of the team in 1885, when a match is said to have been played against Cambridge University Ice Hockey Club in St Moritz, Switzerland. This date is recognised by the Hockey Hall of Fame, and prior to the 1985 Ice Hockey Varsity Match, the International Ice Hockey Federation formally recognised the 1885 game as the first ice hockey match played in Europe. However, there is no contemporary evidence that this match took place, and Oxford now claims that this was a bandy match.

History
The oldest surviving evidence of their existence is a team photo and roster from 1895, when they played Cambridge in another bandy match at Blenheim Palace. In 1900, they played Cambridge at Princes Skating Club in the first official Varsity Match, winning 7–6. Their captain in this match was future cricketer Bernard Bosanquet.

With the introduction of the Rhodes Scholarship, the top Canadian players at the University of Oxford formed the Oxford Canadians, but after World War I, the University of Oxford team included Rhodes Scholars. Such players included Lester B. Pearson, Roland Michener, George F.G. Stanley, Clarence Campbell, Allan Blakeney, Ronald Martland and Otto Lang. Thus strengthened, it won the Spengler Cup in 1923, 1925 and 1931. In 1932, they tied the tournament with LTC Prague.

In 1931, the team entered the first English League, winning both the inaugural season and the second. When the league disbanded in 1936, they did not follow most of the teams into the English National League, but in 1938 joined the lower level London and Provincial League. From 1948 to 55, they played in the Southern Intermediate League. After a long break from league competition, they entered two seasons of the Southern League in the 1970s, then joined the Inter-City League and finally played in the first season of the British Hockey League. In 2004 the Blues joined the British Universities Ice Hockey Association league. Today the team is based at the Oxford Ice Rink, and continues to compete in Division One of the BUIHA, as well as playing the annual Varsity Match against Cambridge.

Notable former players

The Club attracts many Canadian students at Oxford, with most of its prominent former players assuming visible roles in Canadian public life.

Mark Carney (Captain) - former Governor of the Bank of England and former Governor of the Bank of Canada; current United Nations Special Envoy for Climate Action and Finance
Lester B. Pearson - former Prime Minister of Canada, former Foreign Minister of Canada and Nobel Peace Prize Laureate
Michael Spence - recipient of the 2001 Nobel Prize in Economics
Roland Michener - former Governor General of Canada
James Coyne - former Governor of the Bank of Canada
David Lametti (Captain) - Minister of Justice and Attorney General of Canada
Otto Lang - former Minister of Justice and Attorney General of Canada
Clarence Campbell - president of the National Hockey League from 1946 to 1977
Ronald Martland - former Puisne Justice of the Supreme Court of Canada
H. Ian Macdonald - former President of York University and Chairman of Hockey Canada (1987-1994), responsible for Canada's Olympic and  World Championship hockey programme
George F. Stanley - former Lieutenant-Governor of New Brunswick and designer of the current Canadian flag
Danny Williams - former Premier of Newfoundland and Labrador
Allan Blakeney - former Premier of Saskatchewan
Robert Gordon Robertson - former Commissioner of the Northwest Territories and Chancellor of Carleton University
John McCall MacBain (Captain) - Canadian billionaire businessman and philanthropist, dubbed the “Second Century Founder of the Rhodes Scholarship” for his £75 million donation to the Rhodes Trust
Charles Herbert Little - Canadian Director of Naval Intelligence during the Second World War
Edward Pitblado - Olympic ice hockey bronze medallist
William Feindel - Canadian neurosurgeon and Chancellor of Acadia University, who developed positron-emission tomography for medical imaging
Gordon Blair - former judge, Member of Parliament and president of the Royal Canadian Legion
Ramsay Gunton - former president of the Royal College of Physicians and Surgeons of Canada and chair of the Department of Medicine at the University of Western Ontario
David Tedone - Chief Operating Officer at TalentUp Africa and former President of the Texas A&M University Ice Hockey team.

References

University ice hockey teams in England
Ice Hockey Club
Ice hockey clubs established in 1885
1885 establishments in England